Events from the year 1911 in art.

Events
 January 18 – French jazz musician Charles Delaunay is born in Paris, the son of artists Sonia and Robert Delaunay. Sonia makes a patchwork quilt for his crib which is influential in the development of Orphism.
 February 2 – First issue of Franz Pfemfert's Die Aktion.
 May – Only exhibition by The London Secession group of photographers, at the Newman Gallery.
 June 10 – Rembrandt House Museum opened in Amsterdam.
 August 21 – Leonardo da Vinci's Mona Lisa is stolen from the Louvre museum in Paris by Vincenzo Peruggia; the theft is discovered the following day when painter Louis Béroud arrives to sketch it but the painting is not located until December 1913. Poet and art critic Guillaume Apollinaire and his friend Pablo Picasso are questioned over the theft.
 Creation of Der Blaue Reiter Group (first exhibition opens December 18 in Munich).
 Creation of the Puteaux Group.
 Creation of the Camden Town Group.
 Wassily Kandinsky publishes Über das Geistige in der Kunst, Insbesondere in der Malerei ("Concerning the Spiritual in Art, and Painting in Particular" or "The Art of Spiritual Harmony"), dated 1912.
 Rayonism developed in Russia by Mikhail Larionov and Natalia Goncharova.
 English wood engraver Gwen Darwin marries French painter Jacques Raverat.

Exhibitions
 April 21–June 13 – Salon des Indépendants; Jean Metzinger, Albert Gleizes, Henri Le Fauconnier, Robert Delaunay, Fernand Léger, Joseph Csaky and Roger de La Fresnaye are shown together in Room 41, provoking an 'involuntary scandal' out of which Cubism emerges and spreads in Paris. The term "Cubism" is first used in English.
 May 11 – A Futurist exhibition in Milan is the first of efforts by the group to make its theories concrete.
 May 20–July 2 – Second International Art Exhibition in Düsseldorf (Kunsthalle), organised by Sonderbund westdeutscher Kunstfreunde und Künstler
 October 1–November 8 – Salon d'Automne; At this exhibition, Jean Metzinger, Albert Gleizes, Henri Le Fauconnier, Fernand Léger, František Kupka, André Lhote, Roger de La Fresnaye, Francis Picabia and Marcel Duchamp, Alexander Archipenko, Joseph Csaky exhibit Cubist works; and André Mare designs the decorative arts section.
 One-man show by Eugeniusz Żak at Galerie Druet.

Works

 Umberto Boccioni
 The Laugh
 Modern Idol
 States of Mind: The Farewells; Those Who Go; Those Who Stay
 The Street Enters the House
 Carlo Carrà – The Funeral of the Anarchist Galli
 Marc Chagall – I and the Village
 Giorgio de Chirico
 Enigma of the Hour
 The Nostalgia of the Infinite
Confederate Monument (Gulfport, Mississippi)
 Robert Delaunay – Champs de Mars: La Tour Rouge
 Herbert Dicksee – Where's Master?
 John Duncan – Riders of the Sidhe
 Lydia Field Emmet – Olivia
 Albert Gleizes
 Portrait de Jacques Nayral
 La Chasse (The Hunt)
 Le Chemin, Paysage à Meudon
 J. W. Godward
 In Realms Of Fancy
 On The Balcony (second version)
 Duncan Grant – Bathing
 Herbert Hampton – Statue of the Duke of Devonshire, Whitehall
 Goscombe John – Statue of Charles Rolls, Monmouth
 Alfons Karpiński – The Parisian Street
 Ernst Ludwig Kirchner
 Böhmischer Waldsee
 Portrait of a Woman
 Fernand Léger
 Le compotier (Table and Fruit)
 Les Toits de Paris (Roofs in Paris)
 Wilhelm Lehmbruck – Kneeling (sculpture)
 Edmund Leighton – Stitching the Standard
 Paul Manship – Duck Girl (bronze)
 Franz Marc
 Blue-Black Fox
 Blaues Pferd I (Blue Horse I)
 Die großen blauen Pferde (The Large Blue Horses)
 Die großen roten Pferde (The Large Red Horses)
 The Little Blue Horses
 Nudes Under Trees
 The Yellow Cow
 Henri Matisse – L'Atelier Rouge
 Jean Metzinger – Le goûter (Tea Time)
 Piet Mondrian – Gray Tree
 Allen George Newman – Peace Monument
 Emil Nolde – Maskenstilleben ("Masks Still Life")
 Pablo Picasso
 The Accordionist
 Le pigeon aux petits pois
 Herbert Ponting – Grotto in an Iceberg (photograph)
 Pierre-Auguste Renoir – Gabrielle with Rose
 John Singer Sargent – Bringing Down Marble from the Quarries to Carrara
 Egon Schiele
 Mädchen ("Girls")
 Masturbation
 Paul Signac – Antibes: the towers
 Charles Robinson Sykes – Spirit of Ecstasy (car mascot)
 Tiffany glass curtain at Palacio de Bellas Artes in Mexico City
 Lesser Ury – Woman in the Romanisches Café
 Adolf Wölfli – General view of the island Neveranger

Births
 January 2 – Alexander Džigurski, Serbian seascape artist (d. 1995).
 January 17 – Izis Bidermanas, Lithuanian-born photographer (d. 1980).
 February 10 – Mallica Reynolds ("Kapo"), Jamaican painter, sculptor and religious leader (d. 1989).
 March 4 – Ilona Harima, Finnish painter (d. 1986).
 March 7 – Edmund Teske, American photographer (d. 1996).
 March 17 – David Park, American painter (d. 1960).
 March 23 – Roger Hilton, English painter (d. 1975).
 May 14 – Carl Abrahams, Jamaican painter (d. 2005).
 May 25 – Will Barnet, American painter, printmaker (d. 2012).
 June 11 – Coby Whitmore, American painter and illustrator (d. 1988)
 July 15 – Juliet Pannett, English portrait artist (d. 2005).
 August 10 – Bruce Ariss, American artist (d. 1994).
 September 2 – Romare Bearden, American painter, printmaker (d. 1988).
 October 9 – Joe Rosenthal, American Pulitzer Prize-winning photographer (d. 2006).
 November 11 – Roberto Matta, Chilean painter (d. 2002).
 November 25 – Roelof Frankot, Dutch painter (d. 1984).
 December 16 – Brett Weston, American photographer (d. 1993).
 December 25 – Louise Bourgeois, French-born painter and sculptor (d. 2010).

Deaths
 January 4 – Stefano Bruzzi, Italian painter (b. 1835)
 January 19 – Valentin Serov, Russian painter (b. 1865)
 January 28 – John MacWhirter, Scottish-born landscape painter (b. 1837)
 February 22 – Carl Fredrik Hill, Swedish painter (b. 1849)
 April 6 – Carl von Perbandt, German landscape painter (b. 1832)
 April 13 – William Keith, Scottish American landscape painter (b. 1838)
 April 19 – Ivan Grohar, Slovenian Impressionist painter (b. 1867)
 May 5 – Halsey Ives, American art teacher and curator (b. 1847)
 May 8 – Alphonse Legros, French-born painter and etcher (b. 1837)
 August 1 – Edwin Austin Abbey, American-born painter and illustrator (b. 1852)
 August 12 – Jozef Israëls, Dutch painter (b. 1824)
 September 16 – Hishida Shunsō, Japanese painter (b. 1874)
 October 15 – Ellen Thayer Fisher, American botanical painter (b. 1847)
 November 10 – Félix Ziem, French painter (b. 1821)

References

 
Years of the 20th century in art
1910s in art